The following radio stations broadcast on FM frequency 103.5 MHz:

Argentina
 City in Granadero Baigorria, Santa Fe
 LRI428 La X in Santa Fe de la Vera Cruz, Santa Fe
 Radio María in Empedrado, Corrientes
 Retro in Rosario, Santa Fe
 Sensación in Las Parejas, Santa Fe

Australia
 3MBR in Murrayville, Victoria
 3MBS in Melbourne, Victoria
 4MBB in Maryborough, Queensland
 ABC Classic FM in Armidale, New South Wales
 ABC Classic FM in Roxby Downs, South Australia
 Hot FM (Australian radio network) in Cairns, Queensland
 Radio National in Swifts Creek, Victoria
 Radio TAB in Mackay, Queensland
 Rhema FM Orange in Orange, New South Wales
 SBS Radio in Wagga Wagga, New South Wales
 Triple J in Port Pirie, South Australia
 Triple J in Spencer Gulf

Canada (Channel 278)
 CBDF-FM in Haines Junction, Yukon
 CBDI-FM in Poplar River, Manitoba
 CBFA-FM-1 in Manouane, Quebec
 CBFG-FM in Chisasibi, Quebec
 CBFH-FM in Fort-Rupert, Quebec
 CBFW-FM in Nouveau-Comptoir, Quebec
 CBKD-FM in Buffalo Narrows, Saskatchewan
 CBNI-FM in Makkovik, Newfoundland and Labrador
 CBSI-FM-16 in Tete-a-la-Baleine, Quebec
 CBVR-FM in New-Richmond, Quebec
 CBXA-FM in Chateh, Alberta
 CBYD-FM in Bella Coola, British Columbia
 CHFA-2-FM in Red Deer, Alberta
 CHMM-FM in Mackenzie, British Columbia
 CHNV-FM in Nelson, British Columbia
 CHOA-FM-1 in Amos/Val d'Or, Quebec
 CHQM-FM in Vancouver, British Columbia
 CHTW-FM in Wadena, Saskatchewan
 CHYP-FM in Maple Creek, Saskatchewan
 CICL-FM in Sherbrooke, Quebec
 CIDC-FM in Orangeville, Ontario
 CILB-FM in Lac la Biche, Alberta
 CIVR-FM in Yellowknife, Northwest Territories
 CJFR-FM in Fisher River, Manitoba
 CJLM-FM in Joliette, Quebec
 CJRP-FM in Saint John, New Brunswick
 CJTK-FM-1 in North Bay, Ontario
 CKCH-FM in Sydney, Nova Scotia
 CKED-FM in Shuniah Township, Ontario
 CKGC-FM in Iqaluit, Nunavut
 CKHJ-2-FM in Oromocto, New Brunswick
 CKHZ-FM in Halifax, Nova Scotia
 CKJJ-FM-4 in Bancroft, Ontario
 CKRB-FM in St-Georges-de-Beauce, Quebec
 CKRC-FM in Weyburn, Saskatchewan
 CKYQ-FM-1 in Victoriaville, Quebec
 VF2209 in Kemano, British Columbia
 VF2218 in Seton Portage, British Columbia
 VF2310 in Elk Valley, British Columbia
 VF7228 in Jonquiere, Quebec

China 
 CNR Business Radio in Shaowu
 CNR China Traffic Radio in Xi'an
 CNR The Voice of China in Hulunbuir and Zhanjiang

Mexico
 XHEM-FM in Ciudad Juárez, Chihuahua
 XHEOLA-FM in Tampico, Tamaulipas
 XHGB-FM in Nanchital, Veracruz
 XHLZ-FM in Torreón, Coahuila
 XHPCH-FM in Parras de la Fuente, Coahuila
 XHPNK-FM in Los Mochis, Sinaloa
 XHPV-FM in Papantla de Olarte, Veracruz 
 XHRX-FM on Cerro Grande Santa Fe (Guadalajara), Jalisco
 XHRZ-FM in Nogales, Sonora
 XHSCBZ-FM in Santiago de Anaya, Hidalgo
 XHTAK-FM in Tapachula, Chiapas
 XHTUG-FM in Tuxtla Gutiérrez, Chiapas
 XHUET-FM in Huetamo, Michoacán

Philippines 
DWKX in Mega Manila
DYCD in Cebu City
DXRV in Davao City
DXUE in Zamboanga City

Russia
 Avtoradio in Vladikavkaz, Osetia
 Mayak in Murmansk, Murmansk region
 Yunost in Magadan, Magadan region
 Radio 3 in Omsk, Omsk region
 Mayak in Petropavlovsk-Kamchatsky, Kamchatka
 Europa Plus in Saratov, Saratov region
 Russkoye Radio in Smolensk, Smolensk region
 Retro FM in Cheboksary, Chuvashia
 Nashe Radio in Chelyabinsk, Chelyabinsk region
 Mayak in Yuzhno-Sakhalinsk, Sakhalin region
 Arti FM in Arti, Sverdlovsk region

United States (Channel 278)
 KAAD-LP in Sonora, California
  in Tahoka, Texas
 KBJX in Mertzon, Texas
 KBPA in Austin, Texas
 KCIZ-LP in Brunswick, Minnesota
 KCKZ in Huntsville, Missouri
 KCYB-LP in Cypress, Texas
 KEWP in Uvalde Estates, Texas
 KHFR-LP in Keosauqua, Iowa
 KHGG-FM in Mansfield, Arkansas
  in Paradise, California
 KISF in Las Vegas, Nevada
  in Tioga, Louisiana
  in Medford, Oregon
  in Glendale, Arizona
 KLPC-LP in Lone Pine, California
 KLUE in Poplar Bluff, Missouri
 KLUU in Wahiawa, Hawaii
  in Waukon, Iowa
 KNTY in Sacramento, California
 KOST in Los Angeles, California
 KPAU in Center, Colorado
 KPGX in Navajo Mountain, Utah
 KPST-FM in Coachella, California
  in Ogden, Kansas
  in Salinas, California
  in Denver, Colorado
 KRHM-LP in Bakersfield, California
  in Salt Lake City, Utah
 KRXW in Roseau, Minnesota
 KSAS-FM in Caldwell, Idaho
 KSVG-LP in Bakersfield, California
 KTEA in Cambria, California
 KTPJ-LP in Pueblo, Colorado
 KTWD in Wallace, Idaho
 KUAL-FM in Brainerd, Minnesota
 KVBX in Taylor, Arizona
  in Anadarko, Oklahoma
  in Big Bear Lake, California
  in Pendleton, Oregon
  in Homer, Alaska
  in Asbury, Missouri
  in North Platte, Nebraska
 KYBY-LP in Montgomery, Texas
  in Mankato, Minnesota
  in Bozeman, Montana
  in New Boston, Texas
 KZTR-LP in Yakima, Washington
  in Devils Lake, North Dakota
 WADR-LP in Janesville, Wisconsin
 WAKY-FM in Radcliff, Kentucky
  in Syracuse, Indiana
 WAWL-LP in Grand Haven, Michigan
  in Frederiksted, Virgin Islands
  in Holyoke, Massachusetts
 WCOC-LP in Jacksonville, Alabama
 WCOM-LP in Chapel Hill, North Carolina
 WCWL-LP in Clearwater Lake, Wisconsin
 WDBF-LP in Decatur, Indiana
 WEGI-LP in Immokalee, Florida
  in Charleston, South Carolina
 WFNE-LP in Wake Forest, North Carolina
  in Gulfport, Florida
  in Hamilton, Ohio
 WHUN-FM in Huntingdon, Pennsylvania
 WHVK in New Hope, Alabama
 WIAH-LP in Evansville, Indiana
 WIKK in Newton, Illinois
  in Knoxville, Tennessee
  in Leesburg, Georgia
 WJKI-FM in Bethany Beach, Delaware
  in Wellsville, New York
 WKCV-LP in La Plume, Pennsylvania
 WKJH-LP in Bryan, Ohio
  in Callaway, Florida
  in Chicago, Illinois
 WKTU in Lake Success, New York
 WLSP-LP in Sun Prairie, Wisconsin
 WMIB in Fort Lauderdale, Florida
 WMMZ in Berwick, Pennsylvania
  in Crozet, Virginia
 WMUZ-FM in Detroit, Michigan
 WNHH-LP in New Haven, Connecticut
  in Pickerington, Ohio
 WOGH in Burgettstown, Pennsylvania
 WONH-LP in New Haven, Connecticut
 WQRZ-LP in Bay Saint Louis, Mississippi
 WQSH in Cobleskill, New York
 WRBO in Como, Mississippi
  in Dunn, North Carolina
 WSIM-LP in Simsbury, Connecticut
 WTAW-FM in Buffalo, Texas
  in Traverse City, Michigan
  in Washington, District of Columbia
  in Sodus, New York
 WXGR-LP in Dover, New Hampshire
 WXHR-LP in Hillman, Michigan
  in Christopher, Illinois
  in Greenwood, South Carolina
  in Marion, Virginia

References

Lists of radio stations by frequency